On 6 July 2013, Boko Haram gunmen attacked the Government Secondary School in the village of Mamudo, Yobe State, Nigeria, killing at least 42 people. Most of the dead were students, with some staff members also killed.

Background
 
The Boko Haram (sometimes referred to as the "Nigerian Taliban") was founded in 2002 to seek the establishment of an Islamic state and fight against the Westernization of Nigeria, which the group maintains is the root cause of criminal behaviour in that country. From 2009 to 2013, violence linked to the Boko Haram insurgency resulted in 3,600 deaths, including 1,600 civilians. In mid-May 2013, Nigeria declared a state of emergency in Adamawa, Borno, and Yobe States, as it aimed to end the Boko Haram insurgency. The resulting crackdown has led to the capture or killing of hundreds of Boko Haram members, with the remainder retreating to mountainous areas from which they have increasingly targeted civilians.

Since 2010, Boko Haram has targeted schools, killing hundreds of students. A spokesperson said such attacks would continue as long as government soldiers continued to interfere with traditional Koran-based education. More than 10,000 children are no longer able to attend school due to attacks by the Boko Haram. Roughly 20,000 people fled Yobe State to Cameroon during June 2013 to escape the violence.

In June 2013, Nigerian soldiers beat students at a Koran-based school, angering Boko Haram members. An attack on June 16 by Boko Haram militants killed seven children, two teachers, two soldiers, and two militants. The next day, militants killed nine students who were taking exams. On 4 July, gunmen attacked and killed a school headmaster and his family.

Attack
Before dawn on 6 July, gunmen attacked the school and killed at least 42 people. A local eyewitness described the situation: "It was a gory sight...There were 42 bodies; most of them were students. Some of them had parts of their bodies blown off and badly burnt while others had gunshot wounds." Most of the dead were students, with a few staff members and a teacher also killed. Some were burned alive while others died of gunshot wounds. At the morgue, parents struggled to identify their children, as many bodies were burned beyond recognition. Survivors were taken to a nearby clinic, guarded by the Nigerian army.

According to survivors, the gunmen gathered the victims in a central location and then began shooting and throwing explosives. The assailants also brought fuel to set the school on fire. Six students who escaped were found hiding in the bushes with gunshot wounds and taken to the hospital. More than 100 others were missing as of 6 July.

Reactions
On 7 July 2013, Yobe State governor Ibrahim Gaidam called the attackers cold-blooded murderers and "devoid of any shred of humanity". He ordered all secondary schools in the state to close until September, the start of the new academic year. He also requested that the national government end the cell phone outage in the state, saying the lack of cell service prevented citizens from alerting authorities of suspicious people in the area prior to the attack.

References

2013 murders in Nigeria
Massacres perpetrated by Boko Haram
Deaths by firearm in Nigeria
High school shootings
Islamic terrorist incidents in 2013
July 2013 crimes in Africa
July 2013 events in Nigeria
Mass murder in 2013
Mass shootings in Nigeria
School massacres
Terrorist incidents in Nigeria in 2013
Mass murder in Yobe State
Attacks on schools in Nigeria
2010s massacres in Nigeria
2013 mass shootings in Africa